Poul Søgaard (né Pedersen; 12 November 1923 – 13 December 2016) was a Danish politician.

Shortly after his 1923 birth in Odense, Poul Pedersen was adopted by Johannes Søgaard, and his name was changed accordingly. In 1939, Poul Søgaard joined the Social Democrats. He was elected to the party council for Odense in 1951, and three years later began serving on the city Council. He ran for and won a seat on the Folketing in 1960. Søgaard was a parliamentarian for thirty years until he stepped down in 1990. In the midst of his legislative career, Søgaard also served as defence minister under Anker Jørgensen from 1977 to 1982.

References

1923 births
2016 deaths
Social Democrats (Denmark) politicians
Members of the Folketing
People from Odense
Danish Defence Ministers
Danish adoptees